A list of Dhallywood films released in 1969.

Released films

See also

 1969 in Pakistan

References

External links 
 Bangladeshi films on Internet Movie Database

Film
Bangladesh
Lists of Pakistani Bengali films by year